Ava is a city in northwest Jackson County, Illinois, United States. The population was 654 at the 2010 census.

Geography
Ava is located in northwestern Jackson County at  (37.889346, -89.496355). Illinois Route 4 passes through the town as Knauer Street, leading northwest  to Steeleville and east  to its end at Illinois Route 13.

Demographics
As of the census of 2000, there were 662 people, 282 households, and 192 families residing in the city. The racial makeup of the city was 98.94% White, 0.30% Native American, 0.15% from other races, and 0.60% from two or more races. Hispanic or Latino of any race were 0.76% of the population.

There were 282 households, out of which 31.9% had children under the age of 18 living with them, 55.0% were married couples living together, 8.9% had a female householder with no husband present, and 31.9% were non-families. 28.0% of all households were made up of individuals, and 19.1% had someone living alone who was 65 years of age or older.  The average household size was 2.35 and the average family size was 2.89.

In the city, the population was spread out, with 24.9% under the age of 18, 6.8% from 18 to 24, 26.7% from 25 to 44, 23.3% from 45 to 64, and 18.3% who were 65 years of age or older.  The median age was 38 years. For every 100 females, there were 93.6 males.  For every 100 females age 18 and over, there were 88.3 males.

The median income for a household in the city was $24,750, and the median income for a family was $36,364. Males had a median income of $32,344 versus $22,500 for females. The per capita income for the city was $16,324.  About 12.6% of families and 14.4% of the population were below the poverty line, including 16.6% of those under age 18 and 14.9% of those age 65 or over.

Notable people 

 Andy High, third baseman for the Brooklyn Robins, St. Louis Cardinals, Cincinnati Reds, Boston Braves and Philadelphia Phillies, brother of Charlie
 Charlie High, outfielder for the Philadelphia Athletics, brother of Andy
 Gale R. Williams, Illinois state representative

See also

 List of cities in Illinois

References

External links

Cities in Illinois
Cities in Jackson County, Illinois